Camp Mackall is an active U.S. Army training facility located in eastern Richmond County and northern Scotland County, North Carolina, south of the town of Southern Pines. The facility is in close proximity to and is a subinstallation of Fort Bragg (home to the XVIII Airborne Corps, the 82nd Airborne Division, and the U.S. Army Special Operations Command headquarters). Camp Mackall is the setting of primary training to become a member of U.S. Army Special Forces.

History
Originally named Camp Hoffman, on February 8, 1943, General Order Number 6 renamed the facility Camp Mackall in honor of Private John Thomas (Tommy) Mackall. He was born May 17, 1920 in Ohio and grew up in Wellsville, Ohio. He served in Company E, 2nd Battalion, 509th Parachute Infantry Regiment. During the Allied invasion of North Africa in the airborne segment called Operation Torch, he was mortally wounded in an attack by French Vichy aircraft on his aircraft as the aircraft landed near Oran. Seven paratroopers died at the scene and several were wounded, including Mackall. He was evacuated by air to a British hospital at Gibraltar, where he died on November 12, 1942. He had been wounded on November 8, the day that construction began at the camp. He is buried in Glenview Cemetery in East Palestine, Ohio. Historian Stephen E. Ambrose described the camp as a "marvel of wartime construction", having been converted from 62,000 acres of wilderness to a camp "with 65 miles of paved roads, a 1,200-bed hospital, five movie theaters, six huge beer gardens, a complete all-weather airfield with three 5,000-foot runways, and 1,750 buildings" in just four months.

Facilities
The Mackall Army Airfield has three runways: 4/22 is 5,001 by 150 feet (1,524 x 46 m) with an asphalt surface and 12/30 (originally designated 11/29) is 4,740 by 150 feet (1,445 x 46 m) with a concrete surface.  A new runway 16/34 was constructed in 2016, and is restricted to use by unmanned aerial vehicles.  It is 5500 by 150 feet (1676 x 46 m) and has a concrete surface.  

The Colonel James "Nick" Rowe Training Compound hosts SERE, SFAS, the Q Course, and other training courses. It is named for Col. James N. Rowe. The obstacle course at the camp, arguably the hardest obstacle course in the U.S. Army, is named the "Nasty Nick" in honor of Rowe.

See also
 North Carolina World War II Army Airfields

References

External links 

 

Airports in North Carolina
Military installations in North Carolina
Buildings and structures in Hoke County, North Carolina
Buildings and structures in Richmond County, North Carolina
Buildings and structures in Scotland County, North Carolina
Mackall
Mackall
Airfields of the United States Army Air Forces in North Carolina